The 1966 Major League Baseball All-Star Game was the 37th midseason exhibition between the all-stars of the American League (AL) and the National League (NL), the two leagues comprising Major League Baseball. The game was played on July 12, 1966, at then-new Busch Memorial Stadium in St. Louis, Missouri. 

The 10-inning contest – which was played on a memorably hot and humid afternoon in St. Louis, with a game-time temperature of  – resulted in a 2–1 victory for the NL.

Game summary

The teams managed just six hits apiece in a 10-inning game. A triple by Brooks Robinson in the second inning off Sandy Koufax was followed by a wild pitch, giving the American Leaguers a 1–0 lead. It turned out to be their only run.

The NL tied the score in the fourth against Jim Kaat on singles by Willie Mays, Roberto Clemente and Ron Santo. There would be no more runs until the 10th. Winning pitcher Gaylord Perry got out of a two-on, one-out jam by retiring Bobby Richardson on a pop foul and Bill Freehan with a strikeout. Pete Richert, pitching the bottom of the 10th, surrendered a base hit to Tim McCarver, a sacrifice bunt by Ron Hunt and a walk-off single to center by Maury Wills.

Playing the entire 10 innings at third base and getting three of his team's six hits, Brooks Robinson was named the game's most valuable player, even though he was on the losing side.

American League roster 
The American League roster included 8 future Hall of Fame players.

Pitchers

Position players

Coaching staff

National League roster 
The National League roster included 14 future Hall of Fame players & coaches.

Pitchers

Position players

Coaching staff

Game

Starting lineups

Umpires

Line score

References

External links 
 1966 All-Star Game baseball-almanac.com
 1966 All-Star Game baseball-reference.com

All-Star Game
1966
1966
All-Star Game
Major League Baseball All Star Game
July 1966 sports events in the United States
1966